Garudinia biplagiata is a moth of the family Erebidae first described by George Hampson in 1896. It is found in Bhutan.

References

Cisthenina
Moths described in 1896